The WIPO Academy is the training arm of the World Intellectual Property Organization (WIPO), it was established in 1998. It offers intellectual property (IP) education, training and IP skills-building to government officials, inventors, creators, business professionals, small and medium enterprises (SMEs), academics, students and individuals interested in IP. The Academy hosts IP courses through its four programs: the Professional Development Program, University Partnerships, Distance Learning and WIPO Summer Schools.

Professional Development and Distance Learning 
The Professional Development Program offers specialized IP training for government officials. The Distance Learning Program provides global access to online and blended IP courses at general and advanced levels in the six official languages of the United Nations (English, French, Spanish, Arabic, Russian and Chinese) as well as Portuguese. The courses cover the main areas of IP theory (copyright, patents, and trademarks), IP management and policy, and practical IP skills. The general course on intellectual property (DL-101) is available in an accessible format for the visually impaired. Some of the DL courses, including the DL-101 are run in more than ten languages as a result of course customization and translation by particular countries.

University Partnerships and WIPO Summer Schools 
The WIPO Academy also collaborates with universities to provide access to higher education on IP, especially for developing countries, least developed countries and 'countries in transition'. Its main focus in this area is a series of joint master's degree programs offered in English, French and Spanish. The joint master's degree programs are accredited by and offered in partnership with partner universities including Africa University, Ankara University, Jagiellonian University, KDI School, Tongji University, University of San Andrés, University of Turin and University of Yaoundé II. The Academy organizes a series of two-week long IP summer school programs on an annual basis around the world for young professionals. Under the University Partnerships Program, the Academy co-organizes a number of colloquia (informal meetings) and conferences for IP academics, researchers and teachers including the WIPO-WTO (World Trade Organization) colloquiums for IP teachers.

Projects 
The WIPO Academy has two ongoing projects: IP4Youth&Teachers and the National IP Training Institutions (IPTIs). IP4Youth&Teachers is a service that supports national curricula setters, education policy makers and educators to integrate IP, creativity and innovation education in primary and secondary schools. With the WIPO Academy's projects and support, countries have also established their own IP training capacity through the IPTIs.

External links 

 Official website

References 

World Intellectual Property Organization
Academies
Training organizations